Toxoflavin is a toxin produced by a variety of bacteria including Burkholderia gladioli.  It also has antibiotic properties.

Toxoflavin acts as a pH indicator, changing between yellow and colorless at pH 10.5.

References

Bacterial toxins
Lactams
Pyrimidinediones
Triazines

es:Reumitsina#Derivados